Aikaranad South is a village in Ernakulam district in the Indian state of Kerala. Aikaranad South is also known as Poothrikka. It is situated near to Kolenchery town and is part of a minor eastern suburb of Cochin.

Demographics
 India census, Aikaranad South had a population of 19950 with 10009 males and 9941 females.

References

Villages in Ernakulam district